The 2016 Rio Open was a professional tennis tournament played on outdoor clay courts. It was the 3rd edition of the tournament, and part of the 2016 ATP World Tour and the 2016 WTA Tour. It took in Rio de Janeiro, Brazil between 15 February and 21 February 2016.

Points and prize money

Point distribution

Prize money 

1 Qualifiers prize money is also the Round of 32 prize money
* per team

ATP singles main-draw entrants

Seeds 

 1 Rankings as of February 8, 2016.

Other entrants 
The following players received wildcards into the main draw:
  Nicolás Jarry
  Thiago Monteiro
  João Souza

The following players received entry from the qualifying draw:
  Facundo Bagnis
  Taro Daniel 
  Gastão Elias
  Daniel Gimeno Traver

Withdrawals 
Before the tournament
  Fernando Verdasco→replaced by  Daniel Muñoz de la Nava
   Andreas Haider-Maurer→replaced by  Dušan Lajović

During the tournament 
 Alexandr Dolgopolov (right shoulder injury)

Retirements 
  Fabio Fognini (abdominal strain)
  Dušan Lajović (left foot injury)
  Juan Mónaco (right shoulder injury)

ATP doubles main-draw entrants

Seeds 

 1 Rankings as of February 8, 2016.

Other entrants 
The following pairs received wildcards into the main draw:
  Fabiano de Paula /  Orlando Luz 
  Rogério Dutra Silva /  João Souza

The following pair received entry from the qualifying draw:
  Pablo Carreño /  David Marrero

The following pair received entry as lucky losers:
  Guillermo Durán /  Philipp Oswald

Withdrawals 
Before the tournament
  Fabio Fognini (abdominal strain)

Retirements 
  Jack Sock (lower back injury)

WTA singles main-draw entrants

Seeds 

 1 Rankings as of February 8, 2016

Other entrants 
The following players received wildcards into the main draw:
  Gabriela Cé
  Sorana Cîrstea
  Beatriz Haddad Maia

The following players received entry from the qualifying draw:
  Jennifer Brady
  Cindy Burger
  Mariana Duque Mariño
  Paula Cristina Gonçalves
  María Irigoyen
  Elitsa Kostova

Withdrawals 
Before the tournament
  Eugenie Bouchard (change in schedule) → replaced by  Petra Martić
  Karin Knapp (left knee injury) → replaced by  Sílvia Soler Espinosa

WTA doubles main-draw entrants

Seeds 

 1 Rankings as of February 8, 2016.

Other entrants 
The following pairs received wildcards into the main draw:
  Carolina Alves /  Heidi El Tabakh
  Alizé Lim /  Francesca Schiavone

Withdrawals 
During the tournament 
 Alizé Lim (neck injury)

Champions

Men's singles 

  Pablo Cuevas def.  Guido Pella 6–4, 6–7(5–7), 6–4

Women's singles 

  Francesca Schiavone def.  Shelby Rogers 2–6, 6–2, 6–2

Men's doubles 

  Juan Sebastián Cabal /  Robert Farah def.  Pablo Carreño Busta /  David Marrero 7–6(7–5), 6–1

Women's doubles 

  Verónica Cepede Royg /  María Irigoyen def.  Tara Moore /  Conny Perrin 6–1, 7–6(7–5)

References

External links 
 Official website

Rio de Janeiro Open
Rio de Janeiro Open
2016
Rio